Annikvere may refer to:
 Annikvere, Jõgeva County, village in Estonia
 Annikvere, Lääne-Viru County, village in Estonia